is a passenger railway station located in the city of Matsuyama, Ehime Prefecture, Japan. It is operated by the private transportation company Iyotetsu.

Lines

Layout
The station consists of one side platform serving a single bi-directional track. The station is unattended.  During most of the day, trains arrive every fifteen minutes.

History
The station was opened on February 15, 1967.

Surrounding area
Shigenobu River

See also
 List of railway stations in Japan

References

External links

Iyotetsu Gunchū Line
Railway stations in Ehime Prefecture
Railway stations in Japan opened in 1967
Railway stations in Matsuyama, Ehime